{{Infobox mountain
| name = Saddle Mountain
| photo = Saddle Mountain, Banff NP.jpg
| photo_caption = East aspect
| elevation_m = 2433
| elevation_ref = 
| prominence_m = 107
| prominence_ref =
| isolation_km = 0.74
| isolation_ref =
| range = Bow RangeCanadian Rockies
| parent_peak = Fairview Mountain (2,744 m)
| listing = Mountains of Alberta
| country = Canada | region_type = Province | region = Alberta
| part_type = Protected area | part = Banff National Park
| map = Canada Alberta#Canada
| map_caption = Location in Alberta
| map_size = 260
| label_position = right
| coordinates = 
| coordinates_ref =
| topo = NTS 
| rock = Gog quartzite
| age = Cambrian
| first_ascent = 
| easiest_route = Trail + scrambling<ref>Brian Patton, Bart Robinson (2007), Canadian Rockies Trail Guide, Summerthought Publishing, 

Saddle Mountain is a  summit in Alberta, Canada.

Description
Saddle Mountain is located in the Bow Valley within Banff National Park, and it is part of the Bow Range of the Canadian Rockies. The nearest higher neighbor is Fairview Mountain,  to the northwest. Precipitation runoff from Saddle Mountain drains into tributaries of the Bow River. The peak is visible from Alberta Highway 1 to the east, and is prominent in the iconic photographs taken from Morant's Curve.

Access
The Paradise Valley Trail leads from Lake Louise to Saddleback Pass, and from the pass an off-trail scramble leads to the top of Saddle Mountain. The summit offers one of the finest views of the area, including the Bow Valley and a close view of the impressive north face of Mount Temple.

History
The mountain's descriptive name was applied in 1894 by Samuel E.S. Allen. The mountain's toponym was officially adopted on April 3, 1952, by the Geographical Names Board of Canada.

Geology

Like other mountains in Banff Park, Saddle Mountain is composed of sedimentary rock laid down during the Precambrian to Jurassic periods. Formed in shallow seas, this sedimentary rock was pushed east and over the top of younger rock during the Laramide orogeny.

Climate

Based on the Köppen climate classification, Saddle Mountain is located in a subarctic climate zone with cold, snowy winters, and mild summers. Winter temperatures can drop below -20 °C with wind chill factors below -30 °C.

See also
Geography of Alberta

Gallery

References

External links
 Parks Canada web site: Banff National Park
 Samuel E.S. Allen in memoriam: Americanalpineclub.org

Two-thousanders of Alberta
Mountains of Banff National Park
Canadian Rockies
Alberta's Rockies